
Śrem County is a unit of territorial administration and local government (powiat) in Greater Poland Voivodeship, west-central Poland. It came into being on January 1, 1999, as a result of the Polish local government reforms passed in 1998.

As of 2006 its total population is 58,646, out of which the population of Śrem is 30,227, that of Książ Wielkopolski is 2,724, that of Dolsk is 1,479, and the rural population is 24,216.

Neighbouring counties
Śrem County is bordered by Poznań County to the north, Środa Wielkopolska County to the north-east, Jarocin County to the east, Gostyń County to the south and Kościan County to the west.

Administrative division
The county is subdivided into four gminas (three urban-rural and one rural). These are listed in the following table, in descending order of population.

References
Polish official population figures 2006

 
Land counties of Greater Poland Voivodeship